Sabah Homasi (born October 19, 1988) is an American mixed martial artist currently competing in the Welterweight division of Bellator MMA. A professional competitor since 2009, he has also competed for the UFC, Titan FC, and Strikeforce.

As of February 7, 2023, he is #10 in the Bellator Welterweight Rankings.

Background
Born in Lebanon, New Jersey and raised in nearby East Brunswick, Homasi moved at the age of 10 to Florida and to Dearborn when he had started high school and began training in mixed martial arts. He is of Lebanese descent.

Mixed martial arts career

Early career
Homasi made his professional MMA debut in May 2009. Over the next 7 years he fought for various promotions, including Strikeforce, Titan FC and Bellator MMA. Before joining the UFC he amassed a record of 11 wins against 5 losses.

The Ultimate Fighter
Homasi competed on The Ultimate Fighter: American Top Team vs. Blackzilians, the 21st season of the reality show The Ultimate Fighter. He represented American Top Team. In his first fight on the show, Homasi lost to Carrington Banks via decision after three rounds.

Ultimate Fighting Championship
Homasi made his debut with the Ultimate Fighting Championship on August 20, 2016 against Tim Means on the main card of UFC 202. He lost the fight via TKO in the second round.

In his second fight for the promotion, Homasi faced Abdul Razak Alhassan on December 2, 2017 at UFC 218. He lost the fight via TKO in the first round after a controversial early stoppage.

Due to the stoppage controversy of their first bout, a rematch with Alhassan took place on January 20, 2018 at UFC 220. Homasi lost the fight via knockout in the first round. Homasi was subsequently released from the UFC.

Return to Bellator
In April 2019, Homasi announced that he had signed a contract with Bellator. In his promotional return, Homasi knocked out Micah Terrill in 17 seconds at Bellator 225 on August 24, 2019.

Homasi was next expected to face Paul Daley at Bellator 232 on October 26, 2019. However, he withdrew from the bout due to injury and was replaced by Saad Awad. The bout was then rescheduled to take place at Bellator 241 on March 13, 2020, but the whole event was eventually cancelled due to the prevailing COVID-19 pandemic.

Homasi next faced Curtis Millender on August 7, 2020 at Bellator 243. He won the fight via unanimous decision.

Homasi faced Bobby Voelker October 29, 2020 at Bellator 250. He won the fight via flying knee in the second round. Subsequently, Homasi signed a multi-fight contract with the promotion.

Homasi was rescheduled for the third time to face Paul Daley on April 16, 2021 at Bellator 257. Homasi lost the bout in the second round via TKO after Daley survived getting dropped by Homasi in the first round.

Homasi faced Andrey Koreshkov on August 13, 2021 at Bellator 264. He lost the bout via unanimous decision.

Homasi faced Jaleel Willis on January 29, 2022 at Bellator 273. He won the bout via arm-triangle choke in the first round.

As the first fight of his new multi-fight contract, Homasi faced Maycon Mendonça at Bellator 282 on June 24, 2022. He won the bout after knocking Maycon out in the first round.

Homasi faced Brennan Ward on February 4, 2023 at Bellator 290. Homasi lost by technical knockout in the second round, getting dropped with a head kick and finished with ground and pound.

Championships and accomplishments
MMAjunkie.com
2021 April Fight of the Month vs. Paul Daley

Mixed martial arts record

|-
|Loss
|align=center|17–11
|Brennan Ward
|TKO (head kick and punches)
|Bellator 290
|
|align=center|2
|align=center|1:34
|Inglewood, California, United States
|
|-
|Win
|align=center|17–10
|Maycon Mendonça
|KO (punch)
|Bellator 282
|
|align=center|1
|align=center|0:58
|Uncasville, Connecticut, United States
|
|-
|Win
|align=center|16–10
|Jaleel Willis
|Submission (arm-triangle choke)
|Bellator 273
|
|align=center|1
|align=center|1:42
|Phoenix, Arizona, United States
|
|-
|Loss
|align=center|15–10
|Andrey Koreshkov
|Decision (unanimous)
|Bellator 264
|
|align=center|3
|align=center|5:00
|Uncasville, Connecticut, United States
|
|-
|Loss
|align=center|15–9
|Paul Daley
|TKO (punches)
|Bellator 257
|
|align=center|2
|align=center|1:44
|Uncasville, Connecticut, United States 
|
|-
|Win
|align=center|15–8
|Bobby Voelker
|KO (flying knee and punches)
|Bellator 250
|
|align=center|2
|align=center|0:20
|Uncasville, Connecticut, United States
|
|-
|Win
|align=center|14–8
|Curtis Millender
|Decision (unanimous)
|Bellator 243
|
|align=center|3
|align=center|5:00
|Uncasville, Connecticut, United States
|
|-
|Win
|align=center|13–8
|Micah Terrill
|KO (punch)
|Bellator 225
|
|align=center|1
|align=center|0:17
|Bridgeport, Connecticut, United States
|
|-
|Win
|align=center|12–8
|Muhammad Abdullah
|Decision (unanimous)
|WXC 74: Allegiance
|
|align=center|3
|align=center|5:00
|Southgate, Michigan, United States
|
|-
|Loss
|align=center|11–8
|Abdul Razak Alhassan
|KO (punch)
|UFC 220 
|
|align=center|1
|align=center|3:47
|Boston, Massachusetts, United States
|
|-
|Loss
|align=center|11–7
|Abdul Razak Alhassan
|TKO (punches)
|UFC 218 
|
|align=center|1
|align=center|4:21
|Detroit, Michigan, United States
|
|-
|Loss
|align=center|11–6
|Tim Means
|TKO (punches)
|UFC 202 
|
|align=center|2
|align=center|2:56
|Las Vegas, Nevada, United States
|
|-
| Win
| align=center| 11–5
| Jorge Patino
| KO (punch)
| Titan FC 40
| 
| align=center| 2
| align=center| 1:18
| Coral Gables, Florida, United States
|
|-
| Win
| align=center| 10–5
| Victor Regis Eustáquio
| TKO (punches)
| Titan FC 39
| 
| align=center| 1
| align=center| 2:21
| Coral Gables, Florida, United States
|
|-
| Win
| align=center| 9–5
| Derrick Kennington
| TKO (punches)
| Absolute Fighting Championship 25
| 
| align=center| 1
| align=center| 1:13
| Coconut Creek, Florida, United States
|
|-
| Loss
| align=center| 8–5
| Reggie Pena
| TKO (punches)
| Supreme FC 1
| 
| align=center| 2
| align=center| 1:07
| Tampa, Florida United States
|
|-
| Win
| align=center| 8–4
| Eric Moon
| Submission (guillotine choke)
| Bellator 124
| 
| align=center| 2
| align=center| 1:07
| Plymouth Township, Michigan, United States
| 
|-
| Win
| align=center| 7–4
| Jerome Jones
| TKO (punches)
| MTC: In the Beginning
| 
| align=center| 2
| align=center| 1:02
| Fort Lauderdale, Florida, United States
| 
|-
| Win
| align=center| 6–4
| Michael Trujillo
| TKO (head kick and punches)
| CFA 12: Sampo vs. Thao
| 
| align=center| 1
| align=center| 4:25
| Coral Gables, Florida, United States
| 
|-
| Loss
| align=center| 5–4
| Ricky Legere Jr.
| Submission (rear-naked choke)
| Bellator 93
| 
| align=center| 2
| align=center| 2:52
| Temecula, California, United States
| 
|-
| Win
| align=center| 5–3
| Jose Caceres
| Decision (split)
| CFA 7: Never Give Up
| 
| align=center| 3
| align=center| 5:00
| Coral Gables, Florida, United States
|
|-
| Loss
| align=center| 4–3
| Jon Manley
| Decision (unanimous)
| W-1 MMA 7: Reloaded
| 
| align=center| 3
| align=center| 5:00
| Coral Gables, Florida, United States
| 
|-
| Win
| align=center| 4–2
| Kevin Pearson
| Submission (kimura)
| World Extreme Fighting 46
| 
| align=center| 2
| align=center| 1:35
| Orlando, Florida, United States
| 
|-
| Win
| align=center| 3–2
| Eliton Sarmento
| TKO (retirement)
| World Extreme Fighting 45
| 
| align=center| 2
| align=center| 5:00
| Jacksonville, Florida, United States
| 
|-
| Loss
| align=center| 2–2
| Frank Carrillo
| TKO (elbows)
| Bellator 21
| 
| align=center| 3
| align=center| 3:16
| Hollywood, Florida, United States
|
|-
| Loss
| align=center| 2–1
| John Kelly
| Submission (rear-naked choke)
| Strikeforce: Miami
| 
| align=center| 2
| align=center| 2:48
| Sunrise, Florida, United States
|Welterweight debut.
|-
| Win
| align=center| 2–0
| Adrian Miles
| TKO (punches)
| Inferno: MMA
| 
| align=center| 1
| align=center| 1:28
| Kennesaw, Georgia, United States
| 
|-
| Win
| align=center| 1–0
| Lindon Mitchell
| TKO (punches)
| XFN: Da Matta vs. Thorne
| 
| align=center| 1
| align=center| 1:37
| Fort Lauderdale, Florida, United States
|

See also
List of current Bellator MMA fighters
List of male mixed martial artists

References

External links
 
 

1988 births
Living people
American male mixed martial artists
Welterweight mixed martial artists
People from East Brunswick, New Jersey
People from New Brunswick, New Jersey
Mixed martial artists from New Jersey
Sportspeople from Middlesex County, New Jersey
American people of Lebanese descent
Ultimate Fighting Championship male fighters
Sportspeople of Lebanese descent